Robert Dowland (c. 15911641) was an English lutenist and composer. He was the son of the lutenist and composer John Dowland, who wrote almost 90 lute songs and other pieces written for the lute. Robert Dowland wrote only a few known compositions, including several in Varietie of Lute Lessons.

In 1610 he published two collections of music, A Varietie of Lute Lessons and A Musical Banquet (an anthology of work by other composers including his father). In 1626 his father died and Robert succeeded him as royal lutenist.

References

"Dowland, Robert". Grove Music Online (subscription access).

External links

1590s births
1641 deaths
Composers for lute
English Baroque composers
English classical composers
English lutenists
17th-century English composers
17th-century classical composers
English male classical composers
17th-century male musicians